Anisa Rasooli (born 1969) is an Afghanistani judge.

Life 
She was born in Parwan Province and graduated from Kabul University.

In 2018, she became the first female to sit on the Supreme Court of Afghanistan.

See also 

 List of first women lawyers and judges in Asia

References 

1969 births
Living people
Afghan judges
Afghan women judges
Kabul University alumni
People from Parwan Province
21st-century women judges
Date of birth missing (living people)